Wang Chin is a district (amphoe) in the southern part of Phrae province, northern Thailand.

History
Originally the area of the district was part of Mueang Lampang district. In 1930 it was reassigned to Long district, Phrae Province. On 1 March 1939 the minor district (king amphoe) Wang Chin was established as a subordinate of Long District, which was upgraded to a full district in 1958.

Geography

Neighboring districts are (from the north clockwise): Long and Den Chai of Phrae Province; Si Satchanalai of Sukhothai province; Thoen, Sop Prap, and Mae Tha of Lampang province.

The Phi Pan Nam Mountains dominate the landscape of the district. Wiang Kosai National Park is in it. There are columnar basalt formations in Mon Hin Kong in an area in the mountains near Na Phun, in this district.

Administration
The district is divided into seven sub-districts (tambons), which are further subdivided into 77 villages (mubans). Wang Chin is a township (thesaban tambon) and covers parts of tambon Wang Chin. There are a further seven tambon administrative organizations (TAO).

References

External links
amphoe.com
Wiang Kosai National Park

Wang Chin